Hespeler may refer to:

Hespeler, Ontario, now part of the city of Cambridge
Jacob Hespeler, Canadian businessman and founder of the town of Hespeler
William Hespeler, Canadian businessman and politician
HMCS Hespeler, Royal Canadian Navy ship